Bulgaria competed at the 1992 Summer Olympics in Barcelona, Spain. 138 competitors, 87 men and 51 women, took part in 116 events in 19 sports.

Medalists

Competitors
The following is the list of number of competitors in the Games.

Archery

After a twelve-year absence from archery, Bulgaria returned in 1992.  Only one archer competed.  He did not qualify for the elimination rounds.

Men's Individual Competition:
 Ivan Ivanov — Ranking Round (→ 35th place)

Athletics

Men's 5.000 metres
Evgeni Ignatov
 Heat — did not finish (→ did not advance)

Men's 400m Hurdles
Asen Markov
 Heat — 50.21 (→ did not advance)

Men's Long Jump
Galin Georgiev
 Qualification — 7.75 m (→ did not advance)

Men's Triple Jump
Khristo Markov 
 Qualification — 16.46 m (→ did not advance)
Galin Georgiev 
 Qualification — did not finish (→ did not advance)
Nikolay Raev 
 Qualification — 14.67 m (→ did not advance)

Men's Hammer Throw
Ivan Tanev 
 Qualification — 72.62 m (→ did not advance)
Plamen Minev 
 Qualification — 69.90 m (→ did not advance)

Men's Discus Throw
Nikolay Kolev 
 Qualification — 58.12 m (→ did not advance)

Women's Javelin Throw
Antoaneta Selenska 
 Qualification — 59.40 m (→ did not advance)

Women's High Jump
 Stefka Kostadinova 
 Qualification — 1.92 m
 Final — 1.94 m (→ 4th place)
 Svetlana Leseva 
 Qualification — 1.83 m (→ did not advance)
 Lyudmila Andonova 
 Qualification — 1.88 m (→ did not advance)

Women's Discus Throw
 Tsvetanka Khristova 
 Qualifying Heat — 64.06m
 Final — 67.78m (→  Silver Medal)
 Stefania Simova 
 Qualifying Heat — 65.60m
 Final — 63.42m (→ 8th place)

Badminton

Boxing

Men's Light Flyweight (– 48 kg)
 Daniel Petrov →  Silver Medal
 First Round — Defeated Nelson Dieppa (PUR), 10:7 
 Second Round — Defeated O Song-chol (PRK), RSC-3 
 Quarterfinals — Defeated Pál Lakatos (HUN), 17:8 
 Semifinals — Defeated Jan Quast (GER), 15:9
 Final — Lost to Rogelio Marcelo (CUB), 10:20

Men's Flyweight (– 51 kg)
 Yuliyan Strogov
 First Round — Defeated Ronnie Noan (PNG), RSCI-2 (02:03)
 Second Round — Lost to Timothy Austin (USA), 7:19

Men's Bantamweight (– 54 kg)
 Serafim Todorov
 First Round — Defeated John Sem (PNG), 11:0 
 Second Round — Defeated Joseph Chongo (ZAN), 18:6
 Quarterfinals — Lost to Lee Gwang-Sik (PRK), 15:16

Men's Featherweight (– 67 kg)
 Kirkor Kirkorov
 First Round — Lost to Andreas Tews (GER), 5:9

Men's Lightweight (– 60 kg)
 Tontcho Tontchev
 First Round — Defeated Julio González Valladares (CUB), 14:12 
 Second Round — Defeated Henry Kungsi (PNG), 11:2
 Quarterfinals — Lost to Oscar De La Hoya (USA), 7:16

Men's Middleweight (– 75 kg)
 Stefan Trendafilov
 First Round — Bye
 Second Round — Defeated Lu Chao (CHN), RSC-1 (01:45)
 Quarterfinals — Lost to Chris Johnson (CAN), RSC-1 (02:52)

Men's Super-Heavyweight (+ 91 kg)
 Svilen Rusinov →  Bronze Medal
 First Round — Bye
 Second Round — Defeated István Szikora (HUN), 12:4
 Quarterfinals — Defeated Wilhelm Fischer (GER), 8:5 
 Semifinals — Lost to Richard Igbineghu (NGR), 7:9

Canoeing

Sprint
Men

Women

Cycling

One male cyclist represented Bulgaria in 1992.

Track
Time trial

Diving

Men

Equestrianism

Gymnastics

Diving

Judo

Modern pentathlon

Two male pentathletes represented Bulgaria in 1992.

Individual
 Stefan Asenov
 Valentin Dzhavelkov

Rhythmic gymnastics

Rowing

Men

Women

Shooting

Men

Women

Open

Swimming

Men

Women

Table tennis

Tennis

Weightlifting

Wrestling

References

Nations at the 1992 Summer Olympics
1992
Olympics